Coquitlam Search and Rescue (SAR) is a volunteer, non-profit organization dedicated to wilderness search and rescue in the Coquitlam area of British Columbia, Canada. Its service area includes the communities of Anmore, Belcarra, Burnaby, Coquitlam, New Westminster, Port Coquitlam and Port Moody.

Operations 
Coquitlam Search and Rescue responds to an average of 35 tasks per year.

Volunteers

The all-volunteer team is made up of highly skilled hikers, mountaineers and back country skiers, some of whom dedicate more than 500 hours per year and often conduct rescues at night, in bad weather, and on short notice. The team trains together every Tuesday night. Volunteers also attend special courses, devote time to education and fundraising, and pay for their own personal equipment and clothing.

References

Non-profit organizations based in British Columbia
Volunteer search and rescue organizations
Coquitlam